6-Phosphogluconolactone is an intermediate in the pentose phosphate pathway (PPP).

In the PPP pathway, it is produced from glucose-6-phosphate by glucose-6-phosphate dehydrogenase. It is then converted to 6-Phosphogluconic acid by 6-phosphogluconolactonase.

See also
 Lactone

Organophosphates
Delta-lactones